Narco News is an online newspaper that covers the "War on Drugs” and social movements throughout the Americas. Its articles are available in English and Spanish, with some translations in Italian, French, Portuguese, and German.  Narco News is funded by the Fund for Authentic Journalism.

The founder and editor of Narco News is American journalist Al Giordano. The web magazine currently has correspondents in Bolivia, Brazil, Mexico, and other Latin American countries.

Major news reports

Banamex v. Narco News 

In 1996, Mexican newspaper Por Esto! began running reports that Roberto Hernández – at the time the president of Mexican bank Banamex – was trafficking cocaine on a property he owned near Cancún in the Mexican state of Quintana Roo. Por Esto!s publisher, Mario Menéndez, was subsequently sued in Mexican court for libel. The court found that Menéndez had not libeled, a decision upheld in appeal. A third appeal was made and thrown out of court.

Narco News began publishing the same story in English from its website, allowing the story to reach a wider audience. This culminated in a publicity tour in New York, including a forum at Columbia University with both Giordano and Menéndez in attendance. Banamex then sued Narco News and Menéndez together, maintaining that because potentially libelous information in the news stories were repeated in New York, and that the operators of Narco News web host were headquartered in New York (although the servers were in Maryland), New York therefore had jurisdiction over the matter.

Aside from the propriety of a foreign company filing a case in New York for libel against its president, the case also raised several questions over the rights of websites:

Because of the potential ramifications of the case, The Electronic Frontier Foundation offered itself as amicus curiae. Thomas Lesser, who had previously been Abbie Hoffman's lawyer in his case against the CIA, represented Narco News while Giordano represented himself. Mendéndez hired Martin Garbus as his lawyer, although the court found that it did not have personal jurisdiction over Menéndez.

The New York Supreme Court found that Narco News had not libeled; in fact, the court had not offered any evidence to refute either Por Esto! or Narco News claims. The court set a precedent when it found that Narco News, despite being a website, was similar enough to traditional media that the first amendment applied to it and similar sites as it did any other news-based media. The text of the decision reads:

House of Death 

Narco News was the first publication to investigate the cover-up of the "House of Death" mass murders in 2004, which involved an ICE informant assisting a cell of the Juarez Drug Cartel in planning and carrying out the murders of multiple people as part of a U.S. government-sponsored deep cover operation. In the wake of publishing a series of reports on the House of Death case, Investigative journalist Bill Conroy received intimidating visits at his office, his home, and a visit to his employer from officers of U.S. Immigration and Customs Enforcement (ICE), an event that prompted a letter by Congresswoman Cynthia McKinney reprimanding United States Attorney Johnny Sutton for "an attempt ... to intimidate a journalist who has reported facts that are embarrassing to him".

References

External links
Narco News website
"Speaking Truth to Citi’s Power: Interviews with Citi’s Critics", Multinatinal Monitor,  April 2002
"Drug War on Trial", The Nation, Mark Shapiro, 17 September 2001

American news websites